Glenn Thompson may refer to:
Glenn Thompson (publisher) (1940–2001), American book publisher and activist
Glenn Thompson (politician) (born 1959), Republican Congressman
Glenn Thompson (musician) (born 1964), Australian musician
Glenn Thompson (cricketer) (born 1969), English former cricketer

See also
Glen Thomson (born 1973), cyclist